Piubega is a comune (municipality) in the Province of Mantua in the Italian region Lombardy, located about  east of Milan and about  northwest of Mantua.

Piubega borders the following municipalities: Asola, Casaloldo, Ceresara, Gazoldo degli Ippoliti, Mariana Mantovana, Redondesco.

Demographic evolution

References

Cities and towns in Lombardy